Wahlenbergiella mucosa is a species of saxicolous (rock-dwelling), crustose lichen in the family Verrucariaceae. It is a marine species that grows in the littoral zone, and therefore remains immersed in seawater for extended periods. Its photobiont partner is the green alga Paulbroadya petersii.

The lichen was first formally described by Swedish lichenologist Erik Acharius as Verrucaria mucosa. The original type specimens were collected by Göran Wahlenberg from northern Europe. Cécile Gueidan and Holger Thüs transferred the taxon to the newly circumscribed Wahlenbergiella in 2009 following molecular phylogenetic-directed revisions of the family Verrucariaceae; it is the type species of that genus.

It is one of several marine Verrucariaceae lichens that have been investigated for use as possible bioindicators of coastal water pollution.

References

Verrucariales
Lichen species
Lichens of Northern Europe
Lichens of North America
Lichens described in 1803
Taxa named by Erik Acharius